The Salomón–Lozano Treaty was signed in July 1922 by representatives Fabio Lozano Torrijos, of Colombia and Alberto Salomón Osorio of Peru. The fourth in a succession of treaties on the Colombian-Peruvian disputes over land in the upper Amazon region, it was intended to be a comprehensive settlement of the long border dispute between the two countries.

Background
The United States, who wanted to compensate Colombia over the loss of Panama, pressured Peru to accept a treaty that was unpopular. Peruvian President Augusto B. Leguía forwarded the document to parliament, which was then approved on December 20, 1927. It was first signed on March 24, 1922.

According to Colombian historiography, in this treaty, Colombia had to cede to Peru the area between the Putumayo River and the Napo and Amazon rivers, an area that belonged to Colombia by the uti possidetis iure of 1810 as confirmed by various treaties signed with Ecuador: the Treaty of Pasto of 1832, the Treaty of 1856, and the Muñoz Vernaza-Suárez Treaty of 1916.

According to Peruvian historiography, through this treaty, Peru ceded to Colombia the entire strip between the Caquetá and Putumayo rivers, losing around 100,000 square kilometers of territory that belonged to it due to the uti possidetis iure of 1810, where Peruvian settlements already existed in the ports of Tarapacá and Puerto Arica, founded by Peruvian settlers from former Peruvian territories of the same name lost in the War of the Pacific. The treaty included the town of Leticia and the valuable portion between Putumayo and the Amazon known as the Amazon Trapeze, with the sole purpose of granting Colombia its own exit to the Amazon. By losing this area, Peru lost valuable control over the Amazon river, which it shared with Brazil.

Treaty content and signing
Article 1 of the treaty says the following:

As a result of a Peruvian attack on the river town of Puerto Córdoba, the treaty made both countries to scale back the number of troops in the region. It essentially created a border between both nations along the Putumayo River. Also, Colombia recognized Peruvian territorial claims to the Amazon east of Ecuador, including a new enclave granted by the treaty.

See also
Foreign relations of Colombia
Foreign relations of Peru
Colombia-Peru War

References

External links
 Text of the Treaty (in Spanish)

Treaties of Colombia
Treaties of Peru
1922 in Colombia
Boundary treaties
Colombia–Peru border
Treaties concluded in 1922
Colombia–Peru relations